Guru Gobind Singh Stadium is a multi-purpose stadium in Jalandhar, India.  It is currently used for football matches and is the home stadium of JCT Mills Football Club. The stadium holds 22,000 people.

History 

The stadium is used by the locals of Jalandhar city most of time for the purpose of staying fit. People can be seen jogging, playing football, weight-lifting, etc. in the stadium most of the time. It opens at 5:00 a.m. and closes at 10:00 p.m. Events like Kabbadi, live music shows, award ceremonies etc. are organized at this stadium as well.

The stadium has been installed with floodlights to allow people to enjoy the facilities of the stadium even at night. The stadium has an average sized parking lot on each side for the people coming to it.

Facilities 

 Fully equipped Floodlights 
 Dressing rooms, Referees’ Changing Rooms, Administration Rooms
 VIP/Guest Lounge
 Media Room with facilities for print, radio, live TV broadcast etc.,
 Conference & meeting room
 Medical room
 Spectator facilities 
 Adequate area/space for Vehicle parking

References

Football venues in Punjab, India
Sports venues in Punjab, India
JCT FC
Kabaddi venues in India
Sport in Jalandhar
Memorials to Guru Gobind Singh
Sports venues in Jalandhar
1971 establishments in Punjab, India
Sports venues completed in 1971
20th-century architecture in India